Football Club Internazionale Milano is an Italian professional association football club based in Milan that currently plays in the Italian Serie A. They were one of the founding members of Serie A in 1929, and are the only club never to have been relegated from the league. They have also been involved in European football, winning the UEFA Champions League and the UEFA Cup three times each. Inter become the first Italian club to win back-to-back European Cups, achieving the feat in 1964 and 1965.

This list encompasses the major honours won by Inter Milan and records set by the club, their managers and their players. The player records section includes details of the club's leading goalscorers and those who have made most appearances in first-team competitions. It also records notable achievements by Inter Milan players on the international stage, and the highest transfer fees paid and received by the club.

Inter has set various records since its founding. In 2010, Inter became the first Italian club to win the treble consisting of Serie A, the Coppa Italia and the UEFA Champions League. Between 2005 and 2010, Inter won five consecutive national championships, a record which was broken by Juventus in the 2016–17 season. Inter has also signed several high-profile players, setting the world record in transfer fees on two occasions with the purchase of Ronaldo in 1997 and Christian Vieri in 1999.

The statistics listed below are updated to 23 May 2021.

Honours

Inter Milan have won 34 domestic trophies, including the league nineteen times, the Coppa Italia eight times and the Supercoppa Italiana seven times. From 2006 to 2010, the club won five successive league titles, equalling the all-time record in that period. Inter has won the Champions League three times; two back-to-back titles in 1964 and 1965, and then another in 2010. The 2010 title completed an unprecedented Italian treble along with the Coppa Italia and the Scudetto. The club has also won three UEFA Cups, two Intercontinental Cups and one FIFA Club World Cup.

National titles
Serie A:
Winners (19): 1909–10, 1919–20, 1929–30, 1937–38, 1939–40, 1952–53, 1953–54, 1962–63, 1964–65, 1965–66, 1970–71, 1979–80, 1988–89, 2005–06, 2006–07, 2007–08, 2008–09, 2009–10, 2020–21
Runners-up (16): 1932–33, 1933–34, 1934–35, 1940–41, 1948–49, 1950–51, 1961–62, 1963–64, 1966–67, 1969–70, 1992–93, 1997–98, 2002–03, 2010–11, 2019–20, 2021–22

Coppa Italia:
Winners (8): 1938–39, 1977–78, 1981–82, 2004–05, 2005–06, 2009–10, 2010–11, 2021–22
Runners-up (6): 1958–59, 1964–65, 1976–77, 1999–2000, 2006–07, 2007–08

Supercoppa Italiana:
Winners (7): 1989, 2005, 2006, 2008, 2010, 2021, 2022
Runners-up (4): 2000, 2007, 2009, 2011

International titles 
The following titles include only those which are recognised by UEFA and FIFA.

World-wide titles
Intercontinental Cup:
Winners (2): 1964, 1965

Intercontinental Supercup:
Runners-up (1): 1968

FIFA Club World Cup:
Winners (1): 2010

European titles
European Cup/UEFA Champions League:
Winners (3): 1963–64, 1964–65, 2009–10
Runners-up (2): 1966–67, 1971–72

UEFA Cup/UEFA Europa League:
Winners (3): 1990–91, 1993–94, 1997–98
Runners-up (2): 1996–97, 2019–20

UEFA Super Cup:
Runners-up (1): 2010

Youth Team honours
Trofeo Giacinto Facchetti:
Champions (10): 1964, 1966, 1969, 1989, 2002, 2007, 2012, 2017, 2018, 2022
Primavera Italian Cup:
Champions (6): 1973, 1976, 1977, 1978, 2006, 2016
Supercoppa Primavera:
Champions (1): 2017
Campionato De Martino / Campionato Under 23:
Champions (8): 1957, 1958, 1959, 1961, 1962, 1963, 1966, 1975
Viareggio World Club Tournament, Carnevale Cup:
Champions (8): 1962, 1971, 1986, 2002, 2008, 2011, 2015, 2018
Blue Stars/FIFA Youth Cup:
Champions (1): 1983
NextGen Series:
Champions (1): 2011–12
Under 14 Championship:
Champions (9): 1988, 1997, 2003, 2006, 2009, 2012, 2013, 2015, 2018
Under 16 Championship:
Champions (8): 1985, 1987, 1991, 1998, 2008, 2014, 2017, 2019
Under 18 Championship:
Champions (6): 1980, 1984, 1991, 2012, 2016, 2017
Under 20 Championship:
Champions (8): 1975, 1983, 1989, 1990, 1991, 2014, 2015, 2018
Filippo De Cecco Tournament:
Champions (2): 2006, 2008

Club statistics

Divisional movements

Serie A 
 Most seasons played in Serie A: 91 (from 1929–30 season to 2022–23 season) (sole club that has played Serie A football in every season from 1909 to 2023)
 Most consecutive wins: 17 (in 2006–07 season)

Matches

Firsts 
First league match: Milan 3–2 Inter, Prima Categoria, 10 January 1909
First Coppa Italia match: Inter 14–0 Acciaierie e Ferriere Novi, 11 November 1926
First European match: Inter 0–0 Birmingham City, Inter-Cities Fairs Cup, 16 May 1956.

Wins 
Record win: 16–0 against ACIVI Vicenza, Prima Categoria, 10 January 1915
Record Serie A win: 9–0 against Casale, 10 September 1933
Record Coppa Italia win: 7–0 against Mantova, 14 September 1958
Record win in European competitions: 7–0 against Lyon, Inter-Cities Fairs Cup, 10 December 1958
Most wins in a Serie A season: 30 (out of 38 games), during the 2006–07 season

Defeats 
Record Serie A defeat: 1–9 against Juventus, 10 June 1961. 
Record Coppa Italia defeat:
 0–5 against Milan, 8 January 1998
Record defeat in European competitions:
 1–5 against Arsenal, UEFA Champions League, 25 November 2003
Most defeats in a Serie A season: 19 (out of 40 games), during the 1947–48 season
Fewest defeats in a Serie A season: 1 (out of 38 games), during the 2006–07 season

Points 
Most points in a Serie A season:
Two points for a win: 58 in 34 games, during the 1988–89 season
Three points for a win: 97 in 38 games, during the 2006–07 season
Fewest points in a Serie A season:
Two points for a win: 26 in 30 games, during the 1941–42 season
Three points for a win: 46 in 38 games, during the 1998–99 season

Player statistics

Most appearances

 Most appearances made in official competitions: 858 – Javier Zanetti, 1995–2014

Top goalscorers

 Most goals scored in official competitions: 284 – Giuseppe Meazza, 1927–1940 & 1946–1947

Inter Milan's top flight top goalscorers

This is the list of Inter's top league goalscorers in a single season.

Award winners

FIFA World Player of the Year
The following players won the FIFA World Player of the Year award whilst playing for Inter Milan:
2002 –  Ronaldo
1997 –  Ronaldo
1991 –  Lothar Matthäus

Ballon d'Or/European Footballer of the Year
The following players have won the Ballon d'Or award whilst playing for Inter Milan:
1997 –  Ronaldo
1990 –  Lothar Matthäus

World Soccer Player of the Year
The following players have won the World Player of the Year award whilst playing for Inter Milan:
2002 –  Ronaldo
1997 –  Ronaldo
1990 –  Lothar Matthäus

UEFA Club Footballer of the Year
The following players have won the UEFA Club Footballer of the Year award whilst playing for Inter Milan:
2009–10 –  Diego Milito
1997–98 –  Ronaldo

Serie A Footballer of the Year
The following players have won the Serie A Footballer of the Year award whilst playing for Inter Milan:
2021 –  Romelu Lukaku
2018 –  Mauro Icardi
2010 –  Diego Milito
2009 –  Zlatan Ibrahimović
2008 –  Zlatan Ibrahimović
1998 –  Ronaldo

Serie A Goalkeeper of the Year
The following players have won the Serie A Goalkeeper of the Year award whilst playing for Inter Milan:
2019 –  Samir Handanović
2013 –  Samir Handanović
2010 –  Júlio César
2009 –  Júlio César

Serie A Most Valuable Player
The following players have won the Serie A Award for most valuable player whilst playing for Inter Milan:
2021 –  Romelu Lukaku

Serie A Best Defender
The following players have won the Serie A Award for best defender whilst playing for Inter Milan:
2020 –  Stefan de Vrij

Serie A Best Midfielder
The following players have won the Serie A Award for best midfielder whilst playing for Inter Milan:
2022 –  Marcelo Brozović
2021 –  Nicolò Barella

Serie A Coach of the Year
The following managers have won the Serie A Coach of the Year award whilst managing Inter Milan:
2021 –  Antonio Conte
2010 –  José Mourinho
2009 –  José Mourinho

UEFA Europa League Player of the Season
The following players have won the UEFA Europa League Player of the Season whilst playing for Inter Milan:
2019–20 –  Romelu Lukaku

Transfers

Highest transfer fees paid
Inter Milan's record signings are Romelu Lukaku and Christian Vieri. Lukaku was signed from Manchester United for a reported fee of €65 million in August 2019. Vieri signed for the club from Lazio, for a fee which according to media reports is €49 million, in June 1999.

Highest transfer fees received

The club's record sale came on 12 August 2021, when they sold Romelu Lukaku to Chelsea for a fee of €115 million.

World Cup winning players

The following World Cup winning players played at Inter Milan at some point during their career. Highlighted players played for Inter Milan while winning the World Cup. Relatedly, there has been an Inter Milan player in the FIFA World Cup final for every edition since 1982.

  Luigi Allemandi (Italy 1934)
  Armando Castellazzi (Italy 1934)
  Attilio Demaria (Italy 1934)
  Giovanni Ferrari (Italy 1934)
  Giuseppe Meazza (Italy 1934)
  Carlo Ceresoli (France 1938)
  Giovanni Ferrari (France 1938)
  Pietro Ferraris (France 1938)
  Ugo Locatelli (France 1938)
  Giuseppe Meazza (France 1938)
  Renato Olmi (France 1938)
  Pietro Serantoni (France 1938)
  Jair da Costa (Chile 1962)
  Daniel Passarella (Argentina 1978)
  Alessandro Altobelli (Spain 1982)
  Giuseppe Bergomi (Spain 1982)
  Ivano Bordon (Spain 1982)
  Franco Causio (Spain 1982)
  Giampiero Marini (Spain 1982)
  Gabriele Oriali (Spain 1982)
  Franco Selvaggi (Spain 1982)
  Marco Tardelli (Spain 1982)
  Fulvio Collovati (Spain 1982)
  Daniel Passarella (Mexico 1986)
  Andreas Brehme (Italy 1990)
  Jürgen Klinsmann (Italy 1990)
  Lothar Matthäus (Italy 1990)
  Ronaldo (United States 1994)
  Laurent Blanc (France 1998)
  Youri Djorkaeff (France 1998)
  Patrick Vieira (France 1998)
  Lúcio (South Korea/Japan 2002)
 Roberto Carlos (South Korea/Japan 2002)
  Ronaldo (South Korea/Japan 2002)
  Vampeta (South Korea/Japan 2002)
  Fabio Cannavaro (Germany 2006)
  Fabio Grosso (Germany 2006)
  Marco Materazzi (Germany 2006)
  Angelo Peruzzi (Germany 2006)
  Andrea Pirlo (Germany 2006)
  Lukas Podolski (Brazil 2014)
  Lautaro Martínez (Qatar 2022)

Footnotes

References

External links
 

Records And Statistics
Italian football club statistics
Records